Wondwossen Abebe Gebreyes is an African-American veterinary physician; Hazel C. Youngberg Distinguished Professor and Executive Director of the One Global Health initiative (GOHi) at The Ohio State University. He was elected as a Full Member of the National Academy of Medicine in 2021.

Early life and education 
Gebreyes was born in Addis Ababa, Ethiopia. He was an undergraduate student at Addis Ababa University, where he was trained in veterinary medicine and achieved his Doctor of Veterinary Medicine in 1990. He practiced as a field veterinarian in Borena. He moved to the Sidama Region in 1993, where he worked as Head Veterinarian of the Southern Region Veterinary Department. He moved to the United States in 1995, where he moved in with a cousin in Washington, D.C. He eventually moved to North Carolina, where he was appointed research associate in the College of Veterinary Medicine at North Carolina State University. He started a doctoral research program in the Department of Population Health and Pathobiology. His research considered the epidemiology of multi-drug resistant Salmonella. He joined the Sigma Xi and Phi Zeta honor society. He was awarded his diploma from the American College of Veterinary Preventive Medicine in 2002.

Research and career 
Gebreyes was appointed to the faculty at North Carolina State University in 2001. He was recruited to the faculty of Ohio State University in 2006 as an Associate Professor, where he was promoted to Professor in 2011. In 2012 Gebreyes was made Chair of the One Global Health Initiative at Ohio State. His research considers antimicrobial resistance and food-borne pathogens. He has dedicated his career to global capacity building and international education.

Awards and honors 
 2007 Elected Fellow of the President's Leadership Institute at Ohio State University
 2009 American Society for Microbiology Minority Professor of the Month
 2015 Association of Public and Land-grant Universities Michael P. Malone Award
 2015 Andrew Heiskell Award
 2016 Universitas 21 Award for Internationalisation
 2017 North Carolina State University Alumni Award
 2021 Elected to the National Academy of Medicine

Selected publications

References 

Living people
American veterinarians
Veterinarians from Africa
Ohio State University faculty
Members of the National Academy of Medicine
Year of birth missing (living people)